Lufbery, often misspelt Lufberry, Luffbery or Luffberry may refer to:

Lufbery automobile, built in France, 1898-1902
Raoul Lufbery, French-American air ace of World War I
Lufbery circle, an aerial maneuver incorrectly associated with Raoul Lufbery